S. Srinivasan is an Indian civil engineer, who is best known for translating the Tirukkural into Kannada.

Biography
S. Srinivasan was born in Kollegal in Karnataka into a Tamil-speaking family. He did his schooling at Tharagapura and Alahalli villages. He then attended St. Philomena's College in Mysore and Sri Ramakrishna Mission Polytechnic at Coimbatore. He began his career in 1965 as civil engineer and retired in 2003. He then started writing for the Tamil magazine Udayam and came to be known to the Tamil readers as 'Udayam' Srinivasan. His translation of Girish Karnad's 'Hayavadhana' was staged at the Delhi Tamil Sangam.

In 2014, Srinivasan translated the entire Kural text into Kannada in verse. It was published by the Central Institute of Classical Tamil in Chennai.

See also

 Tirukkural translations
 Tirukkural translations into Kannada
 List of translators

References

Tamil–Kannada translators
Translators of the Tirukkural into Kannada
Tirukkural translators